Indulis is a Latvian masculine given name, borne by more than 1,000 men in Latvia. Its nameday is celebrated on 2 January.

The name has two possible derivations, one from a Baltic word meaning "gift", and the other as a diminutive of Indriķis, the Latvian form of Heinrich.

Indulis was the name of the hero of the legend of Indulis and Ārija, the Latvian Romeo and Juliet, set in the 13th century during the German conquest, which relates the tragic love of Indulis, a Curonian chieftain, and Ārija, daughter of a German military commander. The name was revived, along with many other medieval names, in the late 19th century, and was brought to especial prominence by the poet and dramatist Rainis with the publication in 1911 of his play "Indulis un Ārija".

As a modern name, Indulis is better-known than many Latvian names because of Indulis Emsis, Prime Minister of Latvia in 2004, the first Green head of state in the world.

People with the name Indulis
Indulis Bekmanis (born 1989), Latvian professional road cyclist
Indulis Bērziņš, Latvian politician
Indulis Bikše, cross-country skier 
Indulis Emsis (born 1952), Latvian biologist and politician, 18th Prime Minister of Latvia

Sources
 Pilsonības un Migrācijas Lietu Parvalde (PMLP): Office of Citizenship and Migration Affairs personal name database

Notes

References
 Latkovskis, Leonards, 1971: Latgalu uzvordi, palames un dzymtas II. Munich: Latgalu izdevniecība 
 Siliņš, K., 1990: Latviešu personvārdu vārdnīca. Rīga: Zinātne 

Latvian masculine given names